David-Zvi Pinkas (5 December 1895 – 14 August 1952) was a Zionist activist and Israeli politician. A signatory of the Israeli declaration of independence, he was the country's third Minister of Transport.

Biography
Born in Sopron in Austria-Hungary (today in Hungary), Pinkas attended high school in Vienna, before studying at a yeshiva in Freiburg and law at the University of Vienna. He was involved in Zionist youth groups, and was one of the leaders of Young Mizrachi in Vienna and one of the founders of the Yeshuran movement.

In 1923, he was a delegate to the 13th Zionist congress, and two years later immigrated to Mandate Palestine. He became director of Bank Mizrahi in 1932, the same year in which he was elected to Tel Aviv city council. Three years later he was appointed head of the city's education department.

Political career
In 1944 he became a member of the Assembly of Representatives, and between 1947 and 1948 served as a member of the Jewish National Council's directorate. In 1948 he was one of the people to sign the Israeli declaration of independence. During the subsequent Arab-Israeli War, he was one of the leaders of the security committee.

Following independence, Pinkas assumed membership of the Provisional State Council, and was responsible for drawing up the regulations for the council's committees. In Israel's first elections in 1949 he was elected to the Knesset as a member of the United Religious Front, an alliance of Agudat Yisrael, Poalei Agudat Yisrael, Mizrachi (Pinkas' party) and Hapoel HaMizrachi, and served as chairman of the influential finance committee. In 1950, he was also elected Deputy Mayor of Tel Aviv.

In the 1951 elections Mizrachi ran alone, and Pinkas retained his seat, though the party won only two mandates. He was appointed Minister of Transport, and remained chairman of the finance committee. In his role as Minister of Transport, Pinkas stopped public transport from operating on Shabbat.

Death
In June 1952, a bomb was left on his doorstep by Amos Kenan and Shaltiel Ben Yair. He was not harmed in the assassination attempt but died two months later of a heart attack. He is buried in the Trumpeldor Cemetery in Tel Aviv. Ramat Pinkas was named after him.

References

External links
 

1895 births
1952 deaths
Austrian emigrants to Mandatory Palestine
Austrian Jews
Austrian Zionists
Burials at Trumpeldor Cemetery
Deputy Mayors of Tel Aviv-Yafo
Israeli bankers
Israeli Jews
Israeli people of Austrian-Jewish descent
Jewish Israeli politicians
Jews in Mandatory Palestine
Members of the Assembly of Representatives (Mandatory Palestine)
Members of the 1st Knesset (1949–1951)
Members of the 2nd Knesset (1951–1955)
Ministers of Transport of Israel
Mizrachi (political party) politicians
People from Sopron
Signatories of the Israeli Declaration of Independence
United Religious Front politicians
University of Vienna alumni
Zionist activists